
Chang'an was the capital of several Chinese dynasties, located on the site of present-day Xi'an, Shaanxi.

Chang'an or Changan may also refer to:

 Air Changan, a former Chinese airline that operated between 1993 and 2007
 Changan Automobile, a Chinese automobile manufacturer
 Chang'an Avenue, a major east–west thoroughfare in Beijing, China
 Chang'an University, a university in Xi'an, Shaanxi, China
 Chhagan Bhujbal, a politician from India

Locations in the People's Republic of China

Districts
 Chang'an District, Shijiazhuang, in Shijiazhuang, Hebei
 Chang'an District, Xi'an, in Xi'an, Shaanxi, named after the historical capital

Subdistricts
 Chang'an Subdistrict, Jiamusi, in Xiangyang District, Jiamusi, Heilongjiang
 Chang'an Subdistrict, Mudanjiang, in Dong'an District, Mudanjiang, Heilongjiang
 Chang'an Subdistrict, Shuangyashan, in Jianshan District, Shuangyashan, Heilongjiang
 Chang'an, Linxiang (长安街道), in Linxiang, Hunan
 Chang'an Subdistrict, Wuxi, in Huishan District, Wuxi, Jiangsu
 Chang'an Subdistrict, Jiaohe, in Jiaohe, Jilin
 Chang'an Subdistrict, Shenyang, in Dadong District, Shenyang, Liaoning
 Chang'an Subdistrict, Xichang, in Xichang, Sichuan

Towns
Chang'an, Anhui, in Jixi County, Anhui
Chang'an, Dongguan, in Dongguan, Guangdong
Chang'an, Fengkai County, in Fengkai County, Guangdong
Chang'an, Guangxi, in Rong'an County, Guangxi
Chang'an Town, Shijiazhuang, in Gaocheng District, Shijiazhuang, Hebei
Chang'an, Bin County, in Bin County, Heilongjiang
Chang'an, Fujin, in Fujin City, Heilongjiang
Chang'an, Tumen, in Tumen, Jilin
Chang'an, Donggang, in Donggang, Liaoning
Chang'an, Pingli County, in Pingli County, Shaanxi
Chang'an, Haining, in Haining City, Zhejiang
Chang'an, Hangzhou, in Fuyang District, Hangzhou, Zhejiang

Townships
 Chang'an Township, Gansu, in Ganzhou District, Zhangye, Gansu
 Chang'an Township, Guizhou, in Huishui County, Guizhou
 Chang'an Township, Hunan, in Hengyang County, Hunan
 Chang'an Township, Shanxi, in Gujiao, Shanxi
 Chang'an Township, Linshui County, in Linshui County, Sichuan
 Chang'an Township, Luzhou, in Longmatan District, Luzhou, Sichuan
 Chang'an Township, Yunnan, in Weixin County, Yunnan

See also
Xi'an, the present-day name of the city of Chang'an